Allah Verdi Kandi may refer to:
 Allah Verdi Kandi, Chaypareh
 Allah Verdi Kandi, Poldasht